This is a list of the elections of Scottish representative peers. After the Acts of Union 1707, the peerage of Scotland elected sixteen of their number to sit in the House of Lords at Westminster. General elections were held with each Parliament, and by-elections to fill vacancies in between. The elections ceased after the Peerage Act 1963 granted all peers of Scotland an hereditary seat in the House of Lords.

The first election of Scottish representative peers took place on 15 February 1707 at the Parliament House, Edinburgh, shortly before the Parliament of Scotland was adjourned for the last time on 25 March. The commissioners for the barons and the burghs chose their representatives to the British House of Commons at the same time.

List of elections since the Union

References
 Sir James Fergusson, The Sixteen Peers of Scotland (Oxford University Press, 1960) Appendix D, pp. 162–166.

 
Scottish representative peers
representative peers
Lists of by-elections to the Parliament of Great Britain
Lists of by-elections to the Parliament of the United Kingdom